Jeffrey Guy "Jeff" Campbell (born October 2, 1962, in Salt Lake City, Utah) Jeff was raised in Irvine, California and is a graduate of University High School (Irvine, California). Jeff was a three-time All-American at UC Irvine and helped the Anteaters win a national title in 1982, teaming with his older brother, Peter Campbell. He was NCAA Player of the Year and NCAA tournament MVP in 1985.

Jeff is a former Olympic water polo player who won a silver medal for the United States at the 1988 Summer Olympics in Seoul, South Korea. He was also on the US team and placed 4th in the 1992 Summer Olympics in Barcelona, Spain. He is a graduate of UC Irvine. He was named to the UC Irvine Athletic Hall of Fame in 1998 and the USA Water Polo Hall of Fame in 2001.

His older brother, Peter Campbell, was also a former Olympic water polo player who won 2 Silver Medals, 1984 Summer Olympics in Los Angeles & in the summer of 1988 in Seoul, South Korea.

See also
 List of Olympic medalists in water polo (men)

References

External links
 

1962 births
Living people
Water polo players at the 1988 Summer Olympics
Water polo players at the 1992 Summer Olympics
Olympic silver medalists for the United States in water polo
Sportspeople from Salt Lake City
UC Irvine Anteaters men's water polo players
American male water polo players
Medalists at the 1988 Summer Olympics